Collabora is a global private company headquartered in Cambridge, United Kingdom, with offices in Cambridge and Montreal. It provides open-source consultancy, training and products to companies.

Collabora's initial focus was instant messaging (IM), Voice over IP (VoIP) and videoconferencing technologies, but the company has since expanded its offering to include general multimedia, mobile web technologies, collaboration infrastructure, automotive infotainment platforms, graphics optimization, multimedia interoperability & productivity software. Collabora's department Collabora Productivity is one of the main developers of LibreOffice.

In 2015, the Crown Commercial Service announced the introduction of Collabora GovOffice and Collabora CloudSuite in all non-profit making government organisations.

Projects sponsored or founded by Collabora 
 LibreOffice: Collabora Productivity sells support and development services on the office suite. The former LibreOffice development team of SUSE joined Collabora in September 2013.

The company announced a collaboration with IceWarp to work on LibreOffice Online.

On 15 December 2015, the company announced partnership with ownCloud and release of CODE (Collabora Online Development Edition), a distribution of LibreOffice Online and ownCloud Server.
On 2 June 2016, the company released Collabora Online 1.0 "Engine", which the company calls the first production grade version of Collabora Online.
On 2 November 2016, the company released CODE 2.0 which includes "the latest and most requested feature from customers: collaborative editing."
Branded versions of LibreOffice include LibreOffice-From-Collabora, Collabora Office, Collabora Online and Collabora GovOffice.
Collabora Online is shipped with NextCloud Server.

 GStreamer, a multimedia framework.
 D-Bus, a free and open-source inter-process communication (IPC) system.
 PulseAudio, a sound system for POSIX OSes used as the default audio server on most Linux open source distributions. 
 Wayland and Weston (display server protocols)
 Linux kernel Collabora employs multiple kernel subsystem maintainers (e.g. Chromebooks, I3C, battery drivers) and actively contributed to every release in the last few years.
 Farstream and Telepathy, a VoIP and collaboration framework created by Collabora founders.  Includes the Empathy chat client.
 Pitivi, a video editor
vkmark, an extensible Vulkan benchmarking suite with targeted, configurable scenes
Zink, an OpenGL implementation on top of Vulkan via Mesa Gallium
Monado, a free and open source XR (VR/AR/MR) platform and OpenXR Runtime for Linux
NVK, a new open-source Vulkan driver for NVIDIA hardware in Mesa, written almost entirely from scratch using the new official headers from NVIDIA. Intended to be the new reference driver for Mesa.

Participations and memberships 
Linux Foundation - Collabora is a Silver member of the Linux Foundation since 2010.
GENIVI Alliance - Collabora is a member of the GENIVI Alliance since 2011.
Khronos Group - Collabora is a Contributor member of the Khronos Group since 2014.
Bluetooth SIG - Collabora is an Adopter member of the Bluetooth SIG since 2014.
 ARM Connected - Collabora is a member of the ARM Connected Community since 2014.
 Rockchip - Collabora has been working with Rockchip since 2015.
 Automotive Grade Linux - Collabora is a member of Automotive Grade Linux since 2016.
 R-Car Consortium - Collabora is a member of the Renesas R-Car Consortium since 2016.
 Renesas Alliance Partner - Collabora is a member of the Renesas Alliance Partners since 2016.
 Cambridge Network - Since its founding in 2005, Collabora has been a member of the Cambridge Network.
 Debian - Collabora is a long-time member of the Debian community.
 Outreachy - Collabora has been a recurring sponsor of Outreachy for years.
 GNOME - Collabora is a long-time member of the GNOME community.
 LOT Network - Collabora is a member of LOT Network in support of patent non-aggression.
 Open Innovation Network - Collabora is an OIN licensee in support of patent non-aggression

References

External links 
 

 
2005 establishments in the United Kingdom
Companies based in Cambridge
Companies established in 2005
GNOME companies
Information technology consulting firms of the United Kingdom
International information technology consulting firms
LibreOffice
Linux companies
Free software companies